Skykomish State Airport  is a public/civil-use airport located  east of Skykomish, Washington, United States.

Although most U.S. airports use the same three-letter location identifier for the FAA, ICAO and IATA, Skykomish State Airport is assigned S88 by the FAA but has no designation from the ICAO nor the IATA.

Facilities 

References

External links 

Airports in King County, Washington
Airports established in 1949
1949 establishments in Washington (state)